Paul Hempel (30 June 1890 – 25 January 1950) was a German long-distance runner. He competed in the marathon at the 1928 Summer Olympics, finishing 31st.

References

1890 births
1950 deaths
Athletes from Berlin
Athletes (track and field) at the 1928 Summer Olympics
German male long-distance runners
German male marathon runners
Olympic athletes of Germany
19th-century German people
20th-century German people